Efrat Rayten-Marom (born 15 May 1972) is an Israeli actress, lawyer and politician. She is currently a member of the Knesset for the Israeli Labor Party, chairing the Labor, Welfare and Health Committee.

Biography
Rayten originally worked as an actress and television host,. working as a TV presenter on the Children's Channel and Channel 10. However, she left the industry to become a lawyer. Having earned an LLB at the Academic Center for Law and Science in 2004, she was called to the bar in 2012 and became a partner at Goldfarb Seligman & Co. She represented families of children who died in a 2018 flood during a pre-military programme.

Prior to the 2021 elections she was placed fifth on the Labor Party list, and was elected to the Knesset as the party won seven seats. She was placed fourth on the Labor list for the 2022 elections and was re-elected as the party won four seats.

Efrat Rayten lives in Tel Aviv.

Filmography
Rabies (2010)

References

External links

1972 births
Living people
People from Haifa
Academic Center for Law and Science alumni
Israeli television actresses
Israeli women lawyers
Israeli actor-politicians
Israeli Labor Party politicians
Jewish Israeli politicians
Members of the 24th Knesset (2021–2022)
Members of the 25th Knesset (2022–)
Women members of the Knesset